Lamaran is a village in Pishin District, Pakistan.

Populated places in Pishin District